Sergeant Charles Blucher was a German soldier who fought in the American Civil War. Blucher received the United States' highest award for bravery during combat, the Medal of Honor, for his action during the Battle of Chaffin's Farm at Fort Harrison in Virginia on 29 September 1864. He was presented with the award on April 6, 1865.

Blucher joined the Army from Harrisburg, Pennsylvania in June 1863, and served as a color bearer in the 188th Pennsylvania Infantry. He was wounded at the Battle of Drewry's Bluff, and mustered out with his regiment in December 1865.

Medal of Honor citation

See also

List of American Civil War Medal of Honor recipients: A–F

References

German-born Medal of Honor recipients
German emigrants to the United States
People of Pennsylvania in the American Civil War
Union Army officers
United States Army Medal of Honor recipients
American Civil War recipients of the Medal of Honor